Amateur radio operators take part in portable operations using radio equipment when traveling. "Portable" equipment indicates a configuration that allows for relatively rapid collection, transportation, and deployment of amateur radio gear. A portable station can be anything from a small QRP (Low Power) radio and antenna, to a large transceiver. On long-distance expeditions, such equipment allows them to report progress, arrivals and sometimes exchanging safety messages along the way.

Portable operations 

'Portable' operation is usually signified by amateur radio operators appending the suffix '/P' to their callsign. Operating '/P' normally means that stations are operating away from their licensed station address.

The advantages of /P operation include the use of large empty spaces where full size beam and wire antennas can be erected on tall trailer mounted masts. If operating on VHF/UHF, this can mean a location on the top of a hill or cliff, with clear line of sight to the horizon. The main disadvantage is normally the power supply available. As normal mains grid power is unavailable, the /P operator may have to resort to batteries, portable generators, solar panels. and wind turbines.

Operating amateur radio at sea is known as 'maritime mobile', as is signified by the suffix '/MM' on the call.
Operating amateur radio from a vehicle is known as 'Mobile', as is signified by the suffix '/M' on the call.

A popular pastime for portable operation is the Summits on the Air programme, part of which involves portable operation from a worldwide list of over 73,500 summits.

Some countries allow the direct connection of amateur transceivers to telephone lines called "phone patching". Thus, a traveler may be able to call another amateur station and, via a phone patch, speak directly with someone else by telephone.

Notes

Portable electronics
Amateur radio